Théodin Roger Ramanjary (born 16 August 1996) is a Malagasy professional footballer who plays as a defender for Malagasy Pro League club Fosa Juniors and the Madagascar national team.

Honours 
Fosa Juniors

 THB Champions League: 2019
 Coupe de Madagascar: 2017, 2019

References 

1996 births
Living people
People from Diana Region
Malagasy footballers
Association football defenders
Fosa Juniors FC players
Malagasy Pro League players
Madagascar international footballers